Eddy Jorge Garabito (born December 2, 1976) is a former Major League Baseball second baseman. He played for the St. George Roadrunners of the Golden Baseball League and played in MLB for the Colorado Rockies and in the minor leagues for the Baltimore Orioles.

External links
, or Retrosheet

1976 births
Living people
Azucareros del Este players
Baseball players at the 2007 Pan American Games
Bluefield Orioles players
Bowie Baysox players
Colorado Rockies players
Colorado Springs Sky Sox players
Delmarva Shorebirds players
Dominican Republic expatriate baseball players in Canada
Dominican Republic expatriate baseball players in Italy
Dominican Republic expatriate baseball players in Mexico
Dominican Republic expatriate baseball players in the United States
Fortitudo Baseball Bologna players
Frederick Keys players

Major League Baseball second basemen
Major League Baseball players from the Dominican Republic
Mexican League baseball outfielders
Mexican League baseball second basemen
Mexican League baseball shortstops
Mexican League baseball third basemen
Ottawa Lynx players
Rochester Red Wings players
Rojos del Águila de Veracruz players
St. George Roadrunners players
Toros del Este players
Pan American Games competitors for the Dominican Republic